Lyrognathus giannisposatoi sometimes called the Sumatran stout leg tarantula is a tarantula which can be found in Mesuji Regency, Sumatra, Indonesia. It was first described by Steven C. Nunn, Rick C. West in 2013, and is named after Gianni Sposato whom helped with Selenocosmia material, and was of great help to the authors.

Description 
They can be distinguished from all of the Lyrognathus genus, because of its bigger size and a more robust body, and for its preference of lower altitudes, which differs from most of the genus. In females the carapace is a dark brown with some orange almost pinkish striping. The opisthosoma is a deep black color, their legs nearest to the opisthosoma are a black color, getting a more orange even pink color the farther away they are. Males have roughly the same coloration though it is significantly darker.

Behavior 
They are burrowing old world tarantulas, as most tarantulas they will first try to flee, but if unable they are defensive, and it might end up in a bite. As they are old world tarantulas, they probably strong venom. They usually make burrows, where they spend most of their time in.

References 

Spiders described in 2013
Spiders of Indonesia
Spiders of Asia
Theraphosidae